The 1987 Spa 24 Hour was the fifth round of the inaugural World Touring Car Championship. The race was held for cars eligible for Group A touring car regulations. It was held from 1 to 2 August 1987 at the Circuit de Spa-Francorchamps, in Francorchamps, Belgium.

The race was won by Eric van de Poele, Jean-Michel Martin and Didier Theys, driving a BMW M3. The leading car eligible for championship points was another M3, driven by Luis Pérez-Sala, Olivier Grouillard and Winfried Vogt, who finished in second place.

Class structure
Cars were divided into three classes based on engine capacity:
 Division 1: 1-1600cc
 Division 2: 1601-2500cc
 Division 3: Over 2500cc

Official results
Results were as follows:
| Entered: 61
| Started: 61
| Finished: 28

 Drivers in italics practiced in the car but did not take part in the race.

See also
 1987 World Touring Car Championship

References

1987 World Touring Car Championship season
1987 in Belgian motorsport
1987